Francesco Lamon (born 5 February 1994) is an Italian professional track and road cyclist, who currently rides for UCI Continental team . He rode in the men's team pursuit at the 2016 UCI Track Cycling World Championships. He won the gold medal in the team pursuit at the 2020 Summer Olympics held at Tokyo in 2021, setting a new world record.

Major results

Track
2016
 2nd  Team pursuit, UEC European Championships
2017
 1st Team pursuit, UCI World Cup, Pruszków
 2nd  Team pursuit, UEC European Championships
 3rd  Team pursuit, UCI World Championships
2020
 2nd  Team pursuit, UEC European Championships
2021
 1st  Team pursuit, Olympic Games
 1st  Team pursuit, UCI World Championships
2022
 UCI Nations Cup, Cali
1st Madison (with Michele Scartezzini)
1st Team pursuit
 2nd  Team pursuit, UCI World Championships
2023
 1st  Team pursuit, UEC European Championships

World records

Road
2015
 1st Memorial Denis Zanette e Daniele Del Ben

References

External links
 
 
 
 
 
 

1994 births
Living people
Italian male cyclists
Italian track cyclists
Olympic cyclists of Italy
Olympic gold medalists for Italy
Olympic medalists in cycling
Cyclists at the 2016 Summer Olympics
Cyclists at the 2020 Summer Olympics
Medalists at the 2020 Summer Olympics
European Championships (multi-sport event) gold medalists
Cyclists at the 2019 European Games
European Games medalists in cycling
European Games silver medalists for Italy
Cyclists of Fiamme Azzurre
People from Mirano
Cyclists from the Metropolitan City of Venice
UCI Track Cycling World Champions (men)
21st-century Italian people